Ivan Gordon Sharpe (15 June 1889 – 9 February 1968) was an English amateur footballer. Although an amateur himself, he played for several professional clubs, including Watford, Derby County— with whom he won the Football League First Division in 1911–12–and later Leeds United. He represented the England national amateur football team, and also the Great Britain Olympic football team, with whom he won an Olympic gold medal at the 1912 games in Sweden. He is also one of very few players to have played for both Leeds City (65 appearances and 17 goals) and Leeds United (1 appearance 0 goals).

After retirement he enjoyed a long career as a sports journalist, becoming president of the Football Writers Association. He served as editor of the Athletic News Football Annual and also of the Athletic News Cricket Annual. In 1936 he was selected by the BBC to be one of two journalists (the other being Norman Creek) who for the first time provided live commentary on the FA Cup Final. He continued to contribute a hard-hitting article to the Wolverhampton Wanderers match day programme for many years right up to his death. He produced a volume of memoirs "40 Years in Football" in 1954, as well as writing "Soccer Top Ten" in 1962, detailing his ten favourite players.

International goals
England Amateurs score listed first, score column indicates score after each Sharpe goal.

References

 
 

1889 births
1968 deaths
English footballers
England amateur international footballers
Watford F.C. players
Glossop North End A.F.C. players
Derby County F.C. players
Leeds City F.C. players
Leeds United F.C. players
Footballers at the 1912 Summer Olympics
Olympic footballers of Great Britain
English Olympic medallists
Olympic gold medallists for Great Britain
Southern Football League players
English Football League players
Olympic medalists in football
English sportswriters
Medalists at the 1912 Summer Olympics
Association football wingers
Sportspeople from St Albans